Lanyero Sarah Ochieng also known as Sarah Ochieng Lanyero (born on 14 July 1967) is a Ugandan Politician. She was the Member of Parliament in the ninth Parliament of Uganda representing Lamwo District under the National Resistance Movement political party.

Politics 
She served as the MP for the ninth Parliament of Lamwo District. She was among the nominated candidates in the 2020 primaries according to the National Resistance Movement (NRM) Electoral Commission released list.

Controversy 
In 2021, Sarah  filed  an election petition against Nancy Acora, the Lamwo District Woman Member of Parliament in Gulu High Court over allegations that the election was marred with irregularities such as voter bribery, intimidation of voters, rigging, violence with additional influence meddling by the Lamwo Resident District Commissioner, Nabinson Kidega and Lamwo County Member of Parliament, Hilary Onek. During the 14th January elections in 2021 for the eleventh Parliament, Acora won the elections with 17,064 votes against Molly Lanyero with 12,062 votes. However, Npalo Nasulu Hussein, the Deputy Registrar Gulu High Court said that Lanyero's petition lacked enough evidence. Some of the Lamwo District woman parliamentary candidates who participated in the race were: Lamunu Nancy (Independent), Nyeko Jones Jennifer (Alliance for National Transformation), and Labote Faith Balmoi (Independent).

See also 

 List of members of the ninth Parliament of Uganda

References

External links 

1967 births
Living people
National Resistance Movement politicians
Members of the Parliament of Uganda
Parliament of Uganda
Women members of the Parliament of Uganda
People from Lamwo District